Červený Kostelec is a town in Náchod District in the Hradec Králové Region of the Czech Republic. It has about 8,200 inhabitants.

Administrative parts
The villages of Bohdašín, Horní Kostelec, Lhota za Červeným Kostelcem, Mstětín, Olešnice and Stolín are administrative parts of Červený Kostelec.

Etymology
The word kostelec is derived from kostel (i.e. "church") and meant "fortified church". To distinguish it from other municipalities with the same name, the adjective červený (i.e. "red") was added in 1876, which referred to the red Permian formation that was uncovered here, and to the coloring of the local stream, which occurred during floods.

Geography
It lies on the border between the Giant Mountains Foothills and Podorlická Uplands.

History
The first written mention of Kostelec is from 1362. In 1876, it was promoted to a town and changed its name to Červený Kostelec.

Demographics

Culture

Since 1952, the town hosts the Červený Kostelec International Folklore Festival.

Sights
The most notable building is the Church of Saint James the Great. It was originally a Gothic building from the 14th century, destroyed by fire in 1591. It was renewed in 1668 and rebuilt in the Baroque style in 1744–1754 based on plans of architect Kilian Ignaz Dientzenhofer.

Notable people
Martin Růžek (1918–1995), actor
Viktor Kalabis (1923–2006), composer
Karel Sedláček (born 1979), darts player

Twin towns – sister cities

Červený Kostelec is twinned with:
 Küsnacht, Switzerland
 Uchte, Germany
 Warrington, England, United Kingdom
 Ząbkowice Śląskie, Poland

See also
Bohdašín Formation

References

External links

Virtual show

Populated places in Náchod District
Cities and towns in the Czech Republic